The Hockley Railway Viaduct is a disused railway viaduct to the south of Winchester in Hampshire, England.

History
The viaduct, originally called the Shawford Viaduct, was built in the late 1880s by the London and South Western Railway (LSWR). It provided a link over the River Itchen and water meadows, from the Didcot, Newbury and Southampton Railway (DN&SR), to the LSWR's main line. The DN&SR was originally intended to continue down the east side of the Itchen to Southampton, but had stalled at Winchester due to lack of funds. The viaduct crossed the valley to link the DN&SR to the LSWR, which ran (and still runs) down the west side of the valley.

The viaduct was last used by the railway on 2 April 1966. The line it carried closed as a result of the Beeching Axe, although all of it, with the exception of a few bricks on the walls, is still standing and is open to walkers and cyclists. It forms part of the National Cycle Network Route 23.

Construction

The structure has 33 spans. Although it appears to be a brick structure, the viaduct in fact has a solid concrete core in its pillars, with the bricks simply performing an aesthetic function. The bricks came from the Poole Brickworks in Wellington, Somerset, and the blue engineering capping bricks from Blanchards at Bishop's Waltham. It was long suspected that the viaduct's structure contained concrete, but not until recent borings into the structure were made was it realised that the majority of the bridge was made of the material. This makes it amongst the earliest modern structures to have a solid concrete core.

Preservation
Unsuccessful attempts have been made to have the structure listed in order to attract National Lottery funding to assist in its preservation. The structure is of some historic interest due to its method of construction, and the importance of the route in the lead up to D-Day. It also provides a footpath and cycleway across the Itchen, and acts as a partial screen between the water meadows and the elevated M3 motorway at the foot of Twyford Down. In 2007 Winchester City Council announced a £500,000 rolling programme of repairs over 12 years.  However the City Council had held back on any repairs since Sustrans was interested in taking over the Viaduct as part of its Hampshire cycle route system. In March 2012 Hampshire County Council provided a further £250,000 in funding to assist in bringing the viaduct into use as part of National Cycle Route 23, running between Reading and the Isle of Wight. Restoration was undertaken by the combined expertise of Sustrans, Winchester City Council and Hampshire County Council.  The Friends of Hockley Viaduct provided a replacement home signal and its lattice post, and an original nearby telegraph post has been restored and re-erected. Sustrans has signed a 40year maintenance contract with the City Council.

The restored viaduct was officially opened on 26 February 2013 by World Champion cyclist Dani King, who was born and brought up in Eastleigh. Over 100 invited guests attended a display concerning the history and restoration of the Viaduct in Winchester Guildhall before either cycling to the Viaduct alongside King or riding down to it in a King Alfred Buses double decker bus for the official opening. A red ribbon, held by Winchester Mayor Frank Pearson and former Councillor George Beckett, was breasted by King and her entourage.

References

External links
 Information about walking or cycling along the viaduct at Visit Winchester
 History of the viaduct

History of Winchester
Railway viaducts in Hampshire
Industrial archaeological sites in England
Former railway bridges in the United Kingdom